In the 10th edition of Systema Naturae, Carl Linnaeus classified the arthropods, including insects, arachnids and crustaceans, among his class "Insecta". Insects with simply two wings (true flies) were brought together under the name Diptera.

Oestrus (botflies)
Oestrus bovis – Hypoderma bovis
Oestrus tarandi – Hypoderma tarandi
Oestrus nasalis – Gasterophilus nasalis
Oestrus haemorrhoidalis – Gasterophilus haemorrhoidalis, nose bot
Oestrus ovis – Oestrus ovis, sheep botfly

Tipula (craneflies)

Tipula pectinicornis – Ctenophora pectinicornis
Tipula rivosa – Pedicia rivosa
Tipula crocata – Nephrotoma crocata
Tipula oleracea – Tipula oleracea
Tipula hortorum – Tipula hortorum
Tipula variegata – nomen oblitum for Tipula vernalis Meigen, 1804 
Tipula contaminata – Ptychoptera contaminata
Tipula lunata – Tipula lunata
Tipula pratensis – Nephrotoma pratensis
Tipula terrestris – Limonia stigma (Meigen, 1818)
Tipula cornicina – Nephrotoma cornicina
Tipula nigra – Nigrotipula nigra
Tipula atrata – Tanyptera atrata
Tipula maculata – nomen oblitum for Dictenidia bimaculata (Linnaeus, 1761)
Tipula annulata – Limonia annulata
Tipula flavescens – Nephrotoma flavescens
Tipula regelationis – Trichocera regelationis
Tipula replicata – Phalacrocera replicata
Tipula plumosa – Chironomus plumosus
Tipula littoralis – [nomen dubium] in Chironomus 
Tipula motatrix – Cricotopus motatrix
Tipula vibratoria – Cricotopus sylvestris
Tipula tremula – Cricotopus tremulus
Tipula monilis – Ablabesmyia monilis
Tipula macrocephala – [nomen dubium]
Tipula marci & Tipula brevicornis – Bibio marci
Tipula putris – [nomen dubium]
Tipula febrilis – Dilophus febrilis
Tipula florilega – [nomen dubium]
Tipula hortulana – Bibio hortulana
Tipula phalaenoides – Psychoda phalaenoides
Tipula notata – Scatopse notata
Tipula juniperina – Oligotrophus juniperinus
Tipula palustris – Cecidomyia palustris
Tipula longicornis – [nomen dubium]
Tipula pinnicornis – [nomen dubium]

Musca (houseflies & hoverflies)

[[File:Scatophaga.stercoraria.6984.jpg|thumb|Scathophaga stercoraria was named Musca stercoraria in 1758.]]Musca plebeja – Thereva plebejaMusca illucens – Hermetia illucensMusca chamaeleon – Stratiomys chamaeleon, clubbed generalMusca microleon – Odontomyia microleonMusca hydroleon – Odontomyia hydroleonMusca pantherina – Nemotelus pantherinusMusca morio – Hemipenthes morioMusca maura – Hemipenthes mauraMusca hottentotta – Villa hottentottaMusca scolopacea – Rhagio scolopaceus, downlooker snipe flyMusca vermileo – Vermileo vermileoMusca tringaria – Rhagio tringariusMusca conopsoides – Ceriana conopsoidesMusca bombylans – Volucella bombylansMusca mystacea – Mesembrina mystaceaMusca lappona – Sericomyia lapponaMusca pendula – Helophilus pendulusMusca florea – Myathropa floreaMusca nemorum – Eristalis nemorumMusca arbustorum – Eristalis arbustorum Musca tenax – Eristalis tenax, drone flyMusca intricaria – Eristalis intricariaMusca oestracea – Eristalis oestraceaMusca fallax – Blera fallax, pine hover flyMusca lucorum – Leucozona lucorumMusca sylvarum – Xylota sylvarumMusca bicincta – Chrysotoxum bicinctumMusca arcuata – Chrysotoxum arcuatumMusca mutabilis – Microdon mutabilisMusca ichneumonea – Loxocera ichneumoneaMusca diophthalma – Spilomyia diophthalmaMusca vespiformis – Temnostoma vespiformeMusca festiva – Chrysotoxum festivumMusca erratica – Megasyrphus erraticusMusca glaucia – Leucozona glauciaMusca noctiluca – Pipiza noctilucaMusca gibbosa – Ogcodes gibbosusMusca ribesii – Syrphus ribesiiMusca pyrastri – Scaeva pyrastriMusca transfuga – Anasimyia transfugaMusca menthastri – Sphaerophoria menthastriMusca scripta – Sphaerophoria scriptaMusca mellina – Melanostoma mellinumMusca pipiens – Syritta pipiens, thick-legged hoverflyMusca segnis – Xylota segnisMusca femorata – Chalcosyrphus femoratusMusca inanis – Volucella inanisMusca pellucens – Volucella pellucensMusca meridiana – Mesembrina meridiana, noon flyMusca caesar – Lucilia caesar, common green bottleMusca cadaverina – Pyrellia cadaverinaMusca vomitoria – Calliphora vomitoria, blue bottle flyMusca carnaria – Sarcophaga carnaria, common flesh flyMusca domestica – Musca domestica, houseflyMusca sepulchralis – Eristalinus sepulchralisMusca grossa – Tachina grossa, giant tachinid flyMusca rotundata – Gymnosoma rotundatumMusca larvarum – Exorista larvarumMusca radicum – Delia radicum, cabbage flyMusca lateralis – Fannia canicularis, lesser house flyMusca cemiteriorum – Chrysogaster cemiteriorumMusca pluvialis – Anthomyia pluvialisMusca fenestralis – Scenopinus fenestralisMusca roralis & Musca grossificationis – Melanophora roralisMusca serrata – Heleomyza serrataMusca cellaris – nomen oblitum of Drosophila melanogasterMusca meteorica – Hydrotaea meteoricaMusca putris – Themira putrisMusca frit – Oscinella fritMusca leprae – Hippelates lepraeMusca cupraria – Sargus cuprariusMusca polita – Microchrysa politaMusca viduata – Pipizella viduataMusca pubera – Cordilura puberaMusca petronella – Calobatella petronellaMusca ungulata – Dolichopus ungulatusMusca aequinoctialis – [nomen dubium]Musca cibaria – Compsobata cibariaMusca scybalaria  – Scathophaga scybalariaMusca stercoraria – Scathophaga stercoraria, common yellow dung flyMusca fimetaria – Psila fimetariaMusca parietina – Oxyna parietinaMusca umbrarum – Dictya umbrarumMusca saltuum – Palloptera saltuumMusca vibrans – Seioptera vibransMusca cynipsea – Sepsis cynipseaMusca flava – Chyromya flavaMusca aestuans – [nomen dubium]Musca serratulae  – Terellia serratulaeMusca arnicae  – Tephritis arnicaeMusca hyoscyami  – Tephritis hyoscyamiMusca germinationis  – Opomyza germinationisMusca urticae  – Ceroxys urticaeMusca cerasi – Rhagoletis cerasi, cherry fruit flyMusca heraclii  – Euleia heracleiMusca cardui – Urophora cardui, Canada thistle gall flyMusca solstitialis  – Urophora solstitialisMusca florescentiae – dubious synonym of Terellia ruficauda (Fabricius, 1794)Musca frondescentiae – Herina frondescentiaeTabanus (horse flies)Tabanus bovinus – Tabanus bovinusTabanus calens – Tabanus calensTabanus tarandinus – Hybomitra tarandinaTabanus exaestuans – Leucotabanus exaestuansTabanus fervens – Phaeotabanus fervensTabanus mexicanus – Chlorotabanus mexicanusTabanus bromius – Tabanus bromius, band-eyed brown horseflyTabanus occidentalis – Tabanus occidentalisTabanus tropicus – Hybomitra tropicaTabanus antarcticus – Tabanus antarcticusTabanus pluvialis – Haematopota pluvialisTabanus caecutiens – Chrysops caecutiensCulex (mosquitoes)Culex pipiens & Culex bifurcatus – Culex pipiens, northern house mosquitoCulex pulicaris – Culicoides pulicarisCulex reptans – Simulium reptansCulex equinus – Simulium equinumCulex stercoreus – [nomen dubium]

Empis (dance flies)Empis borealis – Empis borealisEmpis pennipes – Empis pennipesEmpis livida – Empis lividaConops (thick-headed flies)Conops rostrata – Rhingia rostrataConops calcitrans – Stomoxys calcitrans, stable flyConops irritans – Haematobia irritans, horn flyConops macrocephala – Physocephala nigraConops flavipes – Conops flavipesConops buccata – Myopa buccataAsilus (robber flies)Asilus maurus – [nomen dubium]Asilus barbarus – Asilus barbarusAsilus crabroniformis – Asilus crabroniformisAsilus gibbosus – Laphria gibbosaAsilus ater – Andrenosoma atrumAsilus gilvus – Choerades gilvaAsilus marginatus – Choerades marginataAsilus germanicus – Pamponerus germanicusAsilus forcipatus – dubious synonyms of Dysmachus picipes (Meigen, 1820)Asilus tipuloides – synonym of Empis livida Linnaeus, 1758Asilus oelandicus – Dioctria oelandicaAsilus morio – [nomen dubium]

Bombylius (bee flies)Bombylius major – Bombylius major, large beeflyBombylius medius – Bombylius mediusBombylius minor – Bombylius minorHippobosca (louse flies)Hippobosca equina – Hippobosca equina, forest flyHippobosca avicularia – Ornithomya aviculariaHippobosca hirundinis – Crataerina hirundinisHippobosca ovina – Melophagus ovinus'', sheep ked

References
All modern identities are taken from "Systema Dipterorum", accessed November 18, 2010. — present URL  (28 September 2018)

Systema Naturae
Diptera taxonomy
 Systema Naturae, Diptera